Muckleshoot Tribal Schools (MTS) is a K-12 school on the Muckleshoot reservation, in unincorporated King County, Washington, with an Auburn postal address. It is affiliated with the Bureau of Indian Education (BIE). The school is off of Washington State Route 164.

In 1985 the school opened in the tribal community center. At the time it had 45 students. In 2001 it had its first graduating high school class with two students, and its enrollment was 125, with 98% of them being members of the Muckleshoot tribe. In 2009 its current facility opened. Its expected capacity was 500-600. The current facility has  of building area.

References

External links
 Muckleshoot Tribal Schools

Public K-12 schools in the United States
Public elementary schools in Washington (state)
Public middle schools in Washington (state)
Public high schools in Washington (state)
Native American K-12 schools
Schools in King County, Washington
1985 establishments in Washington (state)
Educational institutions established in 1985